Rebecca Sue Stephens (born 3 March 1983) is an Australian politician. She has been a Labor member of the Western Australian Legislative Assembly since the 2021 state election, representing Albany.

She operated a hairdressing business from the age of 23, and at the time of her election to parliament was the regional manager of employment organisation Worklink WA. She was elected to Albany City Council in 2017. She has also been a member of the executive committee of the Albany Chamber of Commerce and a member of the Albany Surf Lifesaving Club.

References

External links 

 
 

Living people
1983 births 
Australian Labor Party members of the Parliament of Western Australia
Members of the Western Australian Legislative Assembly
Western Australian local councillors
Women members of the Western Australian Legislative Assembly
Women local councillors in Australia
21st-century Australian politicians
21st-century Australian women politicians